Aalsmeerderbrug is a hamlet in the Dutch province of North Holland.

Aalsmeerderbrug has a population of around 500.

References

Populated places in North Holland
Haarlemmermeer